Francis More (by 1525 – 1575?) was an English politician. He was a Member (MP) of the Parliament of England for Newcastle-under-Lyme in April 1554.

References

1575 deaths
Members of the Parliament of England for Newcastle-under-Lyme
English MPs 1554
Year of birth uncertain